Gilmer is a surname. Notable people with the surname include:

Alexander Gilmer (1829–1906), sawmill owner
Dixie Gilmer (1901–1954), U.S. Representative from Oklahoma
Elizabeth Gilmer (1880–1960), New Zealand social worker, educationist and horticulturist
Elizabeth Meriwether Gilmer (1861–1951), American columnist better known as Dorothy Dix
Dr. George Gilmer, Sr. (1700–1757), mayor of Williamsburg, Virginia
George Rockingham Gilmer (1790–1859), American politician
Harry Gilmer (1926–2016), College Football Hall of Fame member and National Football League player
Jeremy Francis Gilmer (1818–83), American soldier, Chief Engineer of the Confederate States Army during the American Civil War
John Adams Gilmer (1805–1868), American politician and brother of Jeremy Gilmer
Thomas Walker Gilmer (1802–1844), American statesman
William Gilmer (1863–1955), American Naval officer and Governor of Guam

See also
Gilmore (surname)
Gilmer (disambiguation)